Chaira Borderslee (born 1975, in Alkmaar) is a Dutch singer, actress and dancer.

Biography
Borderslee started singing on when she was five. She sang in the Antillean children's choir Zjozjoli, in which they made albums and children's films. She studied at the Nel Roos Ballet Academy and then followed the premiere and higher professional education training Showmusical at the Amsterdam Dance Academy Lucia Marthas. She grew up in Heiloo.

During her pre-tertiary education, Borderslee was seen as a singer and dancer in many well-known television programmes such as The Voice of Holland and The Next Pop Talent, by Joop van den Ende and John de Mol, in which she performed with celebrities like Barry White. In addition to her high school education, Borderslee also performed vocal studio work on the R&B duo Unknown. Later she was asked to sing at the Dutch-language R&B project Vogelvrij. With this ensemble they recorded an album, two singles and two video clips.

In her graduation year, she made the transition to musical and played in, among others, West Side Story, Miss Saigon, Fame, Aida, Hair and Tarzan. In Aida and Hair she performed key roles.

In 2017 she became a naked partner in the celebrity version of Adam Zkt. Eva.

Theatre credits

External links

References

Dutch musical theatre actresses
Dutch women singers
People from Alkmaar
1975 births
Date of birth unknown
Living people